Novo Selo ( is a village in the municipality of Zelenikovo, North Macedonia.

Demographics
According to the 2002 census, the village had a total of 149 inhabitants. Ethnic groups in the village include:

Macedonians 144
Serbs 5

References

Villages in Zelenikovo Municipality